Michel Jazy (born 13 June 1936) is a French former middle-distance runner and long-distance runner. He won the 1500 metres silver medal at the 1960 Summer Olympics, as well as two golds (in 1962 and 1966) and one silver (in 1966) at the European Championships. He set nine world records in the mile (once), 2000 metres (twice) and 3000 metres (twice), the two miles (twice) and the 4×1500 metres relay (twice).

Early life
Jazy was born into a poor coal-mining family from Poland. His grandfather, together with his wife and their daughter, emigrated from Poland to France after World War I. They settled in Oignies. Michel's grandfather worked as a coal miner in nearby Ostricourt. Michel's father was also a coal miner, whereas Michel's mother worked in a brewery in Lille. Michel was raised by his grandmother during much of his childhood. He was 12 years old when his father died of silicosis. When Michel was 14 years old, he, his mother (Marianne Jazy) and his older sister (Alfreda) settled in Paris. Marianne worked as a waitress in a café in Montmartre. Marianne remarried; her new husband, a truck driver, moved the family into a 10-by-12-foot, one-room apartment at Rue Rodier in Montmartre. Michel was passionate about football when he was a schoolboy. As a schoolboy, he would spend hours daily playing football. Michel left school at the age of 14 and became a uniformed doorman and elevator operator at a bridge club near the Arc de Triomphe. At 16 he became an apprentice in a neighborhood printshop.

Jazy won his first French national championship title in 1953 – the 1000 m race at the youth level (for those under the age of 18 years). He won his second French national championship title in 1955 – the 1500 m race at the junior level (for those under the age of 20 years). His first coach was René Frassinelli, who with Charles Poulenard (the coach of the French, middle-distance runner Jules Ladoumègue), quickly saw Jazy’s potential. In August 1956, Jazy joined the air force. He did 27 months of military service there, but his running career was not interrupted. He set a national record for the 1,500 meters in 1957. In the same year he married Irène Denis, a blonde secretary from Paris. They had two daughters, Pascale (born 1960) and Véronique (born 1963). After Jazy left the air force at the end of 1958, he worked at a printing plant. His employers there had no sympathy with his athletics training schedule and forced him to work overtime. To his rescue came Gaston Meyer, the editor-in-chief of the French daily sports newspaper L'Équipe. Convinced that Jazy could become a champion, Meyer gave Jazy an afternoon typographer's job, which enabled him to train in the mornings.

Running career
In his first participation at the Olympic Games in Melbourne in 1956, Jazy clocked a time of 3:50.0 in the 1500 metres, which equaled his personal best but was not sufficient to reach the final. Yet Jazy was pleased with those Games because he was selected to share a room with the legendary Alain Mimoun. It was a life-changing experience for Jazy. “I came to realize down there in Melbourne what glory was and what sacrifices were necessary in the years ahead to obtain it. Alain Mimoun opened my eyes to what I needed to do. I became hungry. I had got the message.”

At the next Olympic Games in Rome in 1960, Jazy won the silver medal in the 1500 metres. In the final, Jazy ran the race of his life to obliterate his personal best time and set a new national record, finishing 18 metres and 2.8 seconds behind Herb Elliott. Elliott won the final in a new world record time.

In the 1964 Olympics 5000 metres final in Tokyo, Jazy took the lead halfway into the first bend of the final lap. He was ahead of the leading runner of the chasing pack by a body length 100 metres from the finish line. However, he faded badly and finished fourth.

On 30 June 1965, Jazy took part in a 5000 metres race held in the Finnish capital, Helsinki. The race, called "the 5000 metres race of the century" by French newspapers, had a world-class field comprising Jazy, Ron Clarke, Jürgen Haase, Kipchoge Keino, Billy Mills and Bob Schul. Jazy won the race in a personal best and new European record time of 13:27.6 minutes, with Keino and Clarke finishing in second and third place, respectively.

On 12 October 1966 in Saint-Maur-des-Fossés, Jazy won a 2000 metres race in 4:56.2 minutes, which was his ninth and last world record.

Between 1961 and 1966, Jazy set nine world records over the mile (once), 2000 metres (twice) and 3000 metres (twice), the two miles (twice) and the 4×1500 metres relay (twice). Four of those records – the mile, the 3000 metres, the two miles and the 4×1500 metres relay – were set in June 1965. He also set 17 European and 47 national records.

Between 1956 and 1966, Jazy won nine national track titles: two over 800 m, six over 1500 m and one over 5000 m, and three national cross-country titles. He was chosen as the French L'Équipe Champion of Champions in 1960, 1962 and 1965, and was awarded the first Trophée Micheline Ostermeyer on 4 November 2004.

World records

Between 1961 and 1966, Jazy set nine world records over the following distances:
mile (once)
time of 3:53.6 minutes on 9 June 1965 in Rennes
2000 metres (twice)
time of 5:01.6 minutes on 14 June 1962 in Paris
time of 4:56.2 minutes on 12 October 1966 in Saint-Maur-des-Fossés
3000 metres (twice)
time of 7:49.2 minutes on 27 June 1962 in Saint-Maur-des-Fossés
time of 7:49.0 minutes on 23 June 1965 in Melun    
2 miles (twice)
time of 8:29.6 minutes on 6 June 1963 in Paris
time of 8:22.6 minutes on 23 June 1965 in Melun
4×1500 metres relay (twice)
time of 15:04.2 minutes on 28 June 1961 in Versailles (the other members of the relay team were Michel Bernard, Robert Bogey and Jean Clausse)  
time of 14:49.0 minutes on 25 June 1965 in Saint-Maur-des-Fossés (the other members of the relay team were Claude Nicolas, Gérard Vervoort and Jean Wadoux)

Personal bests
800 metres: 1:47.1 minutes (1962)
1500 metres: 3:36.3 minutes (1966)
mile: 3:53.6 minutes in Rennes in 1965 (This was a world record that was broken in July 1966 by Jim Ryun. It remained the European mile record until it was broken by Eamon Coghlan in 1975)
2000 metres: 4:56.2 minutes in Saint-Maur-des-Fossés in 1966 (This was a world record that was broken only in June 1976 by John Walker.)
3000 metres: 7:49.0 minutes in Melun in 1965 (This was a world record that was broken only six weeks later by Siegfried Herrmann.)
2 miles: 8:22.6 minutes in Melun in 1965 (This was a world record that was broken in July 1967 by Ron Clarke.) 
5000 metres: 13:27.6 minutes (1965)
4×1500 metres relay (Michel Jazy, Claude Nicolas, Gérard Vervoort and Jean Wadoux): 14:49.0 minutes in Saint-Maur-des-Fossés in 1965 (This was a world record and Jazy ran the third leg of the relay race.)

Competition record

International
(only the position and time in the final are indicated, unless otherwise stated)

National 
Championnats de France d'athlétisme (French National Athletics Championships)
800 m : 2 titles (1961 and 1962)
1,500 m : 6 titles (1956, 1957, 1958, 1960, 1963 and 1964)
5,000 m : 1 title (1966)
Championnat de France de cross-country (French National Cross Country Championships)
3 titles (1962, 1965 and 1966)

References

External links
 
 Michel Jazy's results in all competitions

1936 births
Living people
French male middle-distance runners
French male long-distance runners
Athletes (track and field) at the 1956 Summer Olympics
Athletes (track and field) at the 1960 Summer Olympics
Athletes (track and field) at the 1964 Summer Olympics
Olympic athletes of France
Olympic silver medalists for France
World record setters in athletics (track and field)
French people of Polish descent
European Athletics Championships medalists
Sportspeople from Pas-de-Calais
Medalists at the 1960 Summer Olympics
Olympic silver medalists in athletics (track and field)
20th-century French people
21st-century French people